Newtown Halt was a railway station on the Midland and Great Northern Joint Railway (M&GN) which served the northern part of Great Yarmouth in Norfolk, England. Opened in 1933, it was closed as a wartime economy measure and reopened in 1948 only to last a further eleven years before closing with the line.

History 
The halt was one of seven opened by the M&GN in the summer of 1933 in an attempt to increase revenues on the line. Comprising a single wooden platform situated at ground level, Newtown Halt was located on the northern side of Salisbury Road, approximately ½-mile north of the line's terminus at Yarmouth Beach, giving visitors access to the attractions found in the northern part of Yarmouth, as well as being convenient for Great Yarmouth High School. The area was, however, already well-served by regular bus services and by June 1958 only 25 passengers were found to be boarding trains here during the course of a week. The line crossed Salisbury Road on the level, a signal box standing on the opposite side of the crossing; the signalman was responsible for locking and unlocking the gates to the halt. Following closure in 1959, the rails were lifted but the infrastructure remained intact until the early 1960s. As at 2020 the site of the station is now a car park.

Present day 
Although little evidence of the station remains today, the site of the halt remains unbuilt upon and can be discerned from Salisbury Road where it is used as an official car park by residents. The trackbed immediately to the north and south of the station exists as an unadopted highway.

References

Disused railway stations in Norfolk
Former Midland and Great Northern Joint Railway stations
Railway stations in Great Britain opened in 1933
Railway stations in Great Britain closed in 1939
Railway stations in Great Britain opened in 1948
Railway stations in Great Britain closed in 1959
Great Yarmouth